Daniel Alejandro Camacho Almanza (born 15 October 1998) is a Bolivian footballer who plays for CAI La Chorrera as a midfielder.

Club career
Born in La Paz, Camacho started his career in Bolívar. He made his Primera División debut on 26 May 2016 against Sport Boys Warnes, coming in as a substitute for Juanmi Callejón in the 84th minute. In 2016, he signed to The Strongest, where he won the Liga de Fútbol Profesional Boliviano, playing only 1 match. On 26 January 2019 fellow Bolivian team Aurora signed him.

On 1 March 2021, he officially joined Panamanian outfit CAI La Chorrera.

International career
Camacho made his debut in Bolivia national under-17 football team on 7 March 2015 in the group stage of 2015 South American U-17 Championship against Uruguay, playing 45 minutes. He was included in Bolivia's provisional squad for 2019 Copa América released on 15 May 2019. He later joined the U-21 side, playing only one game, a friendly defeat to the Netherlands 1–4.

In November 2021, he was called up to the senior side for the first time by César Farías in the friendly game against El Salvador, making his debut in the injury time of the second half.

Honours 
Bolivian Primera División: 2016–17

References

External links
 
 

1998 births
Living people
Sportspeople from La Paz
Bolivian footballers
Association football midfielders
Bolivian Primera División players
Club Bolívar players
The Strongest players
Club Aurora players
Bolivia youth international footballers